Fishing Lake 89A is an Indian reserve of the Fishing Lake First Nation in Saskatchewan. It is Section 13 and the southeast portion of Section 14, Township 33, Range 12, west of the Second Meridian. In the 2016 Canadian Census, it recorded a population of 0 living in 0 of its 0 total private dwellings.

References

Indian reserves in Saskatchewan
Division No. 10, Saskatchewan
Fishing Lake First Nation